The term calcium phosphate refers to a family of materials and minerals containing calcium ions (Ca2+) together with inorganic phosphate anions. Some so-called calcium phosphates contain oxide and hydroxide as well. Calcium phosphates are white solids of nutritious value and are found in many living organisms, e.g., bone mineral and tooth enamel. In milk, it exists in a colloidal form in micelles bound to casein protein with magnesium, zinc, and citrate–collectively referred to as colloidal calcium phosphate (CCP). Various calcium phosphate minerals are used in the production of phosphoric acid and fertilizers. Overuse of certain forms of calcium phosphate can lead to nutrient-containing surface runoff and subsequent adverse effects upon receiving waters such as algal blooms and eutrophication (over-enrichment with nutrients and minerals).

Orthophosphates, di- and monohydrogen phosphates
 Monocalcium phosphate, E341 (CAS# 7758-23-8 for anhydrous; CAS#10031-30-8 for monohydrate: Ca(H2PO4)2 and Ca(H2PO4)2(H2O)
 Dicalcium phosphate (dibasic calcium phosphate), E341(ii) (CAS# 7757-93-9): CaHPO4 (mineral: monetite), dihydrate CaHPO4(H2O)2 (mineral: brushite) and monohydrate CaHPO4(H2O)
 Tricalcium phosphate (tribasic calcium phosphate or tricalcic phosphate, sometimes referred to as calcium phosphate or calcium orthophosphate, whitlockite), E341(iii) (CAS#7758-87-4): Ca3(PO4)2
 Octacalcium phosphate (CAS# 13767-12-9): Ca8H2(PO4)6·5H2O
 Amorphous calcium phosphate, a glassy precipitate of variable composition that may be present in biological systems.

Di- and polyphosphates
 Dicalcium diphosphate (CAS#7790-76-3]: Ca2P2O7
 Calcium triphosphate (CAS# 26158-70-3): Ca5(P3O10)2

Hydroxy- and oxo-phosphates
These materials contain other anions in addition to phosphate:
 Hydroxyapatite Ca5(PO4)3(OH)
 Apatite Ca10(PO4)6(OH,F,Cl,Br)2
 Tetracalcium phosphate (CAS#1306-01-0): Ca4(PO4)2O

References

Calcium compounds
Phosphates
Excipients
E-number additives